Ramon Dekkers (4 September 1969 – 27 February 2013) was a Dutch professional kickboxer and an eight-time Muay Thai world champion. Dekkers was a favourite with fight fans due to his fast-paced, aggressive fighting style. Dekkers was also renowned for his willingness to go abroad to fight the Thai champions in their own country.

Biography

Early years
Dekkers was born on 4 September 1969 in Breda, Netherlands. He began learning martial arts at age 12, studying judo for half a year. He then switched to boxing. After a couple of years Dekkers started practicing Muay Thai under Cor Hemmers. After finishing his baker education Dekkers joined Maeng Ho Breda Gym. During Dekkers' early days of training his mother was at the gym every day and eventually she and Hemmers fell in love and got married.

In the beginning of his career Dekkers' manager was Clovis Depretz, the manager of legendary Rob Kaman. This was the reason why Kaman was at ringside during many of Dekkers' matches, including his farewell fight. They often trained together and became good friends. Dekkers and Kaman were dubbed by fight fans in Thailand as "The Double Dutch duo".

In his first fight at 16 years of age, Dekkers won in a spectacular knockout against a well-established older boxer. Although, only weighing about 55 kg, his opponents found out sooner rather than later he was much stronger than he looked. As Dekkers kept on winning his matches by knockout, his reputation of an up-and-coming fighter spread in the Muay Thai community. He was awarded his first title at age 18, when he won the MTBN Dutch Championship on 15 November 1987. Dekkers defeated Kenneth Ramkisoen by knockout with a high kick. Previous to this fight the Dutchman had his first international contest against the reigning European champion, Richard Nam of France. Dekkers lost the fight on points. They would rematch each other a year later for the EMTA European Championship. This time Dekkers won the fight by knockout with a left hook, cross to body combination in the fourth round.

Rise to stardom
Dekkers challenged for the NKBB European Super featherweight Championship against Kevin Morris on 14 April 1988. He defeated his overmatched English opponent by unanimous decision. Over the next year the Dutchman would win a number of fights before defeating Mungkordum Sitchang for the IMTA World Lightweight title. Towards the end of 1988 he faced Gilbert Ballantine from the respected Chakuriki Gym in Amsterdam, Netherlands. Dekkers lost by decision after being outworked by Ballantine over five rounds. This match would spark the beginning of a fierce rivalry between the two men—they would fight two more times with both of them splitting wins.

On 18 February 1990, Dekkers truly moved onto the world stage. In Amsterdam, he faced the reigning Lumpinee champion Namphon Nongkeepahuyuth. He inflicted a rare defeat on Namphon after five rounds, taking the IMF World Light Welterweight title. The two fighters would meet again two months later in a rematch in Bangkok, Thailand. This time the Dutchman, who just had knocked out the number 1 ranked Lumpinee fighter Cherry S. Wanich in Amsterdam, was unable to defeat Namphon and lost a close decision. He returned to Thailand the same year to meet Issara Sakkreerin in a losing bid for Sakkreerin's Lumpinee Stadium Lightweight title.

The most notable rival of Dekkers was multiple Lumpinee champion and living legend Coban Lookchaomaesaitong. In their first encounter on 21 April 1991, Dekkers was knocked out with a left hook. This would be the first of four meetings between the men from 1991 to 1993, in what became one of the biggest rivalries in Muay Thai history. In the rematch, Dekkers won in highlight worthy fashion via devastating knockout. In the third outing of their rivalry, Dekkers was defeated by decision after five gruelling rounds, but he won the fourth and final fight, evening his score against Coban. The Coban vs. Dekkers fights have been rated as the best by any standards, by Muay Thai fans worldwide.

Dekkers ended 1991 with two wins by knockout over French champion Joel Cezar and a decision loss against Sakmongkol Sitthichok. Between 1992 and 1996, Dekkers would take part in a number of high-profile bouts, defeating fighters such as Joe Prestia, Rittichai Tor. Chalermchai, Mehmet Kaya and Hector Pena. He would also suffer a few defeats, losing his second fight against Joe Prestia as well as failing to defeat among others Jaroenthong Kiatbangchon, Dida Diafat, Orono Por Muang-Ubol and Den Muangsurin.

On November 16, 1996, Dekkers defeated Hassan Kassrioui via unanimous decision in Amsterdam, Netherlands to win the World Professional Kickboxing League (WPKL) World Super Welterweight Championship. By this point, despite the victory, injuries were taking their toll and his career was winding to a close. A month later, he faced Jomhod Kiatadisak in Bangkok, Thailand for the vacant WMTA World Super welterweight title. Dekkers lost the bout by decision. In a memorable match against Rayen Simson in Roosendaal, Netherlands in 1997 both fighters went to the canvas at the same time from a left hook. Dekkers injured his eye in the process and had to give up, losing the fight by technical knockout at the end of the second round. He would go back to winning ways by defeating Saengtiennoi Sor. Rungrot, avenging his two losses against the "Deadly Kisser".

Farewell fight
On 18 March 2001, Ramon Dekkers fought his farewell fight against Marino Deflorin in Rotterdam, the Netherlands. The fight ended in the fourth round with Dekkers knocking a game Deflorin out with a left hook. After the fight, Dekkers joined his Golden Glory team members center stage for a finale, Rob Kaman came down the rampart, presenting a Golden Glory torch to Dekkers, who in turn passed it to each team member, as video clips of his victories were shown on the display screens.

Comeback
After his retirement Dekkers kept himself busy training his two teams, Team Dekkers and Golden Glory. In 2005, however, Dekkers surprised the fighting world by agreeing upon a contract with K-1. He was, however, to fight under MMA rules against Genki Sudo. Dekkers, who never had fought MMA and took the fight on a few days' notice, lost by heel hook.

However, his management arranged another regular K-1 rules fight. Dekkers fought American Duane Ludwig in a superfight during the K-1 Max 2005 event. A few days before the fight Dekkers injured himself, tearing a ligament in his right shoulder. The entire fight he could only punch with his left arm. Nevertheless, Dekkers knocked Ludwig down in every round, and won the fight by decision. His final retirement was a superfight against Joerie Mes at the K-1 World Grand Prix 2006 in Amsterdam event on 13 May 2006, this event was organised by Dutch organisation It's Showtime in collaboration with the Japanese K-1 organisation. After both fighters suffered a knockdown in the second round, it was Mes who earned the decision victory. Immediately after the fight Dekkers announced his final retirement.

Fame and glory in Thailand
Ramon Dekkers fought some of the best fighters Thailand had to offer. Especially in the beginning it was hard for Dekkers to fight at full Thai rules. The scoring methods were different from what he was used to in Europe. "In Thailand it is very difficult to win other than by knocking your opponent out. It has happened to me in many of my fights that I have lost on "points" while fighting in Thailand. It's normal over there losing on points but it can be very frustrating," Dekkers stated in an interview in 1993. Dekkers also blamed some of his losses to his many injuries. Despite his defeats the Thai fight fans had a great respect for Dekkers' determination and ability.

Royal recognition
On the occasion of the 85th anniversary of the King of Thailand, Dekkers received a royal award from the Thai Royal Family for his services to the sport. The Dutchman was also appointed ambassador of all foreign fighters in Thailand. "This is very important to me. It is the greatest recognition that I can get for what I have achieved in this sport," said Dekkers, after the presentation by the Thai princess Ubolratana Rajakanya, the eldest daughter of King Bhumibol Adulyadej.

Death
On 27 February 2013, Dekkers died at the age of 43, after reportedly feeling light-headed while training in his hometown Breda. He was riding his bike when he collapsed. A few bystanders attempted to assist him before emergency services arrived and attempted to revive him to no avail. It was reported that myocardial infarction (heart attack) was the cause of death. Hundreds of family members and friends farewelled Dekkers at his funeral at the Zuylen cemetery. The funeral procession was accompanied by dozens of members of the Motorbike Club Satudarah, as well as an airplane with a banner reading: the Diamond is 4ever, rest in peace.

Titles
1987 MTBN Dutch Featherweight Champion
1988 EMTA European Featherweight Champion
1988 NKBB European Super Featherweight Champion
1989 IMTA World Lightweight Champion 
1990 IMF World Light Welterweight Champion (2 title defenses)
1992 WMTA World Light Welterweight Champion (1 title defense)
1995 WMTA World Welterweight Champion
1996 WPKL World Super Welterweight Champion (2 title defenses)

Awards
 2013 Royal award from the Thai Royal Family for his services to the sport

Fight record

|-  style="background:#fbb;"
| 2006-05-13 || Loss ||align=left| Joerie Mes || K-1 World Grand Prix 2006 in Amsterdam || Amsterdam, Netherlands || Decision (Unanimous) || 3 || 3:00 ||
|-  style="background:#cfc;"
|-  style="background:#cfc;"
| 2005-07-20 || Win ||align=left| Duane Ludwig || K-1 World MAX 2005 Final, Super Fight || Yokohama, Japan || Decision (Unanimous) || 3 || 3:00 ||
|-  style="background:#cfc;"
| 2001-03-18 || Win ||align=left| Marino Deflorin || 2 Hot 2 Handle III: Simply The Best || Rotterdam, Netherlands || TKO || 4 || 0:18 ||
|-  style="background:#c5d2ea;"
| 2000-11-01 || Draw ||align=left| Akeomi Nitta || K-1 J-MAX 2000 || Tokyo, Japan || Decision draw (Majority) || 5 || 3:00 ||
|-  style="background:#fbb;"
| 2000-01-25 || Loss ||align=left| Takayuki Kohiruimaki || K-1 Rising 2000 || Nagasaki, Nagasaki, Japan || TKO (Leg injury) || 1 || 3:00 ||
|-  style="background:#cfc;"
| 1998-11-14 || Win ||align=left| Kenichi Ogata || Shootboxing "Ground Zero" || Chiyoda, Tokyo, Japan || KO (Left hook) || 4 || 2:58 ||
|-
! style=background:white colspan=9 |
|-  style="background:#fbb;"
| 1998-05-23 || Loss ||align=left| Abdelkader Tarzati || Muay Thai Champions League - Part II, 1st Round || Roosendaal, Holland || Decision (Unanimous) || 3 || 3:00 ||
|-  style="background:#cfc;"
| 1998-04-26 || Win ||align=left| Hiromu Yoshitaka || RKS Presents Shoot the Shooto XX || Yokohama, Japan || Decision (Unanimous) || 5 || 3:00 ||
|-  style="background:#fbb;"
| 1997-11-22 || Loss ||align=left| Dany Bill || King of the Ring || Paris, France || Decision (Unanimous) || 5 || 3:00 ||
|-  style="background:#cfc;"
| 1997-11-10 || Win ||align=left| Hassan Kassrioui || Night of Dynamite || Amsterdam, Netherlands || KO (Punches) || 3 || ||
|-
! style=background:white colspan=9 |
|-  style="background:#fbb;"
| 1997-07-13 || Loss ||align=left| Namkabuan Nongkee Pahuyuth || La Nuit des Titans || Morocco || Decision (Unanimous) || 5 || 3:00 ||
|-  style="background:#cfc;"
| 1997-06-01 || Win ||align=left| Gerald Mamadeus || Battle of Amsterdam || Amsterdam, Netherlands || KO (Low kicks) || 3 || ||
|-  style="background:#cfc;"
| 1997-04-20 || Win ||align=left| Sangtiennoi Sor.Rungroj || The Night of No Mercy || Amsterdam, Netherlands || Decision (Unanimous) || 5 || 3:00 ||
|-  style="background:#fbb;"
| 1997-03-23 || Loss ||align=left| Rayen Simson || Muay Thai Gala: The Night of War || Roosendaal, Netherlands || TKO (Corner stoppage) || 2 || 3:00 ||
|-  style="background:#cfc;"
| 1997-03-05 || Win ||align=left| Wattana Sit-Or || WPKL gala || Dortmund, Germany || KO (Punches) || 1 || ||
|-  style="background:#fbb;"
| 1997-02-27 || Loss ||align=left| Jerry Morris || Muay Thai Gala Hattem || Hattem, Netherlands || Decision (Unanimous) || 5 || ||
|-  style="background:#cfc;"
| 1997-02-01 || Win ||align=left| Pursan || Federation Royale Moracaine Full Semi Light Contact Kick Thai Boxing || Rabat, Morocco || KO (High kick) || 2 || ||

|-  style="background:#cfc;"
| 1996-11-16 || Win ||align=left| Hassan Kassrioui || Night of the New Generation || Amsterdam, Netherlands || Decision (Unanimous) || 5 || 3:00 ||
|-
! style=background:white colspan=9 |
|-  style="background:#fbb;"
| 1996 || Loss ||align=left| Francois Pennacchio || || Milan, Italy || Decision (Unanimous) || 9 || 2:00 ||
|-  style="background:#cfc;"
| 1996-03-16 || Win ||align=left| Fernando Calleros || MAJKF || Bunkyo, Tokyo, Japan || KO (Right hook) || 1 || 2:45 ||
|-  style="background:#fbb;"
| 1995-12-05 || Loss ||align=left| Den Muangsurin || King's Birthday || Macau || Decision (Unanimous) || 5 || 3:00 ||
|-  style="background:#fbb;"
| 1995-11-27 || Loss ||align=left| Teerapong Sitgolyoot || Lumpinee Stadium || Bangkok, Thailand || Decision || 5 || 3:00 ||
|-
! style=background:white colspan=9 |
|-  style="background:#cfc;"
| 1995-10-15 || Win ||align=left| Hector Pena || MAJKF || Bunkyo, Tokyo, Japan || TKO (Corner stoppage) || 2 || 2:35 ||
|-  style="background:#fbb;"
| 1995 || Loss ||align=left| Cherry Sor Wanich || Lumpinee Stadium || Bangkok, Thailand || Decision || 5 || 3:00 ||
|-  style="background:#cfc;"
| 1995-06-02 || Win ||align=left| Taro Minato || MAJKF || Bunkyo, Tokyo, Japan || KO (Body shot) || 1 || 1:33 ||
|-  style="background:#fbb;"
| 1995-04-08 || Loss ||align=left| Orono Por Muang Ubon || || Bangkok, Thailand || Decision  || 5 || 3:00 ||
|-  style="background:#cfc;"
| 1995 || Win ||align=left| James Bond || || Bangkok, Thailand || TKO (Punches) || 4 || ||
|-  style="background:#cfc;"
| 1995-01-27 || Win ||align=left| Nattawhut Pralomran || The Fight Night in Breda || Breda, Netherlands || KO (Punches) || 3 || ||

|-  style="background:#fbb;"
| 1994-09-20 || Loss ||align=left| Jomhod Kiatadisak || Muay Thai World Championships in honor of the King || Bangkok, Thailand || Decision (Unanimous) || 5 || 3:00 ||
|-
! style=background:white colspan=9 |
|-  style="background:#cfc;"
| 1994-10-09 || Win ||align=left| Mourad Djebli || || Milan, Italy || || || ||
|-  style="background:#cfc;"
| 1994 || Win ||align=left| John Bing || || Melbourne, Australia || TKO (Referee stoppage) || 4 || 2:58 ||
|-  style="background:#fbb;"
| 1994 || Loss ||align=left| Saimai Chor Suanatant || || Bangkok, Thailand || Decision (Unanimous) || 5 || 3:00 ||
|-  style="background:#fbb;"
| 1994 || Loss ||align=left| Superlek Sorn E-Sarn || Lumpinee Stadium || Bangkok, Thailand || Decision (Unanimous) || 5 || 3:00 ||
|-  style="background:#fbb;"
| 1994 || Loss ||align=left| Dida Diafat || || || Decision (Unanimous) || 5 || 3:00 ||
|-  style="background:#cfc;"
| 1994-02-20 || Win ||align=left| Gilbert Ballantine || The Night of the Thriller || Amsterdam, Netherlands || Decision (Unanimous) || 5 || 3:00 ||
|-
! style=background:white colspan=9 |
|-  style="background:#cfc;"
| 1993-12-19 || Win ||align=left| Mehmet Kaya || || Paris, France || KO (Right lowkick) || 2 || ||
|-  style="background:#fbb;"
| 1993-12-04 || Loss ||align=left| Jaroenthong Kiatbanchong || King's Birthday in Thailand || Bangkok, Thailand || Decision  || 5 || 3:00 ||
|-
! style=background:white colspan=9 |
|-  style="background:#fbb;"
| 1993-11 || Loss ||align=left| Dida Diafat || Muay Thai Gala in Paris || Paris, France || TKO (Doctor stoppage) || 3 || ||
|-  style="background:#fbb;"
| 1993-10 || Loss ||align=left| Den Muangsurin || || Thailand || Decision (Unanimous) || 5 || 3:00 ||
|-  style="background:#cfc;"
| 1993 || Win ||align=left| Coban Lookchaomaesaitong || || France || Decision (Unanimous) || 5 || 3:00 ||
|-  style="background:#cfc;"
| 1993-06-06 || Win ||align=left| Decharwin || The War in Rotterdam || Rotterdam, Netherlands || KO (Body shot) || 2 || ||
|-  style="background:#fbb;"
| 1993-2 || Loss ||align=left| Chanoy Pon Tawee || Thaiboxing in Hamburg || Hamburg, Germany || Decision (Unanimous) || 5 || 3:00 ||
|-  style="background:#cfc;"
| 1992-11-29 || Win ||align=left| Rittichai Tor. Chalermchai || || Lampang Province || Decision  || 5 || 3:00 ||
|-  style="background:#fbb;"
| 1992-09-20 || Loss ||align=left| Gilbert Ballantine || The Night of Truth || Amsterdam, Netherlands || Decision (Unanimous) || 5 || 3:00 ||
|-
! style=background:white colspan=9 |
|-  style="background:#fbb;"
| 1992-06-20 || Loss ||align=left| Jo Prestia || || Paris, France || Decision (Unanimous) || 5 || 3:00 ||
|-
! style=background:white colspan=9 |
|-  style="background:#fbb;"
| 1992-04-26 || Loss ||align=left| Orono Por Muang Ubon || Muay Thai Spectacle in Bangkok || Bangkok, Thailand || Decision  || 5 || 3:00 ||
|-  style="background:#cfc;"
| 1992-04-09 || Win ||align=left| Jo Prestia || || Paris, France || Decision (Unanimous) || 5 || 3:00 ||
|-  style="background:#fbb;"
| 1992-02-28 || Loss ||align=left| Coban Lookchaomaesaitong || Crocodile Farm|| Samut Prakan, Thailand || Decision (Unanimous) || 5 || 3:00 ||
|-
! style=background:white colspan=9 |
|-  style="background:#fbb;"
| 1991-11-26 || Loss ||align=left| Sakmongkol Sithchuchok || Lumpinee Stadium || Bangkok, Thailand || Decision (Unanimous) || 5 || 3:00 ||
|-  style="background:#cfc;"
| 1991-10-25 || Win ||align=left| Joel Cesar || Thriller in Paris II || Paris, France || KO (Left hook) || 3 || 2:55 ||
|-  style="background:#cfc;"
| 1991-09-23 || Win ||align=left| Joel Cesar || Thriller in Paris I || Paris, France || KO (Left hook) || 1 || 2:30 ||
|-  style="background:#fbb;"
| 1991-09-03 || Loss ||align=left| Sangtiennoi Sor.Rungroj || Lumpinee Stadium || Bangkok, Thailand || Decision (Unanimous) || 5 || 3:00 ||
|-  style="background:#cfc;"
| 1991-08-06 || Win ||align=left| Coban Lookchaomaesaitong || Lumpinee Stadium || Bangkok, Thailand || KO (Right cross) || 1 || ||
|-  style="background:#fbb;"
| 1991-04-21 || Loss ||align=left| Coban Lookchaomaesaitong || IKL || Paris, France || KO (Left hook) || 1 || 1:00 ||
|-  style="background:#cfc;"
| 1991 || Win ||align=left| Sombat Sor Thanikul || Lumpinee Stadium || Bangkok, Thailand || Decision (Unanimous) || 5 || 3:00 ||
|-  style="background:#fbb;"
| 1991-03-22 || Loss ||align=left| Sangtiennoi Sor.Rungroj || MAJKF || Bunkyo, Tokyo, Japan || Decision (Unanimous) || 5 || 3:00 ||
|-  style="background:#fbb;"
| 1990-12-18 || Loss ||align=left| Boonchai Sor. Towanon || MAJKF || Bunkyo, Tokyo, Japan || Decision (Unanimous) || 5 || 3:00 ||
|-  style="background:#fbb;"
| 1990-11-27 || Loss ||align=left| Issara Sakkreerin || Lumpinee Stadium || Bangkok, Thailand || Decision (Unanimous) || 5 || 3:00 ||
|-
! style=background:white colspan=9 |
|-  style="background:#fbb;"
| 1990-08-31 || Loss||align=left| Superlek Sorn E-Sarn || Lumpinee Stadium || Bangkok, Thailand || Decision  || 5 || 3:00 ||
|-  style="background:#fbb;"
| 1990-04-20 || Loss ||align=left| Namphon Nongkee Pahuyuth || Lumpinee Stadium || Bangkok, Thailand || Decision (Unanimous) || 5 || 3:00 ||
|-  style="background:#cfc;"
| 1990-04-01 || Win ||align=left| Thomas McArtney || Holland vs. England || Amsterdam, Netherlands || KO (Left knee) || 2 || ||
|-  style="background:#cfc;"
| 1990-03-27 || Win ||align=left| Cherry Sor Wanich || || Amsterdam, Netherlands || KO (Left hook) || 1 || || 38-5
|-  style="background:#cfc;"
| 1990-02-18 || Win ||align=left| Namphon Nongkee Pahuyuth || || Amsterdam, Netherlands || Decision (Unanimous) || 5 || 3:00 ||
|-
! style=background:white colspan=9 |
|-  style="background:#fbb;"
| 1989-10-08 || Loss ||align=left| Gilbert Ballantine || || Amsterdam, Netherlands || Decision (Unanimous) || 5 || 3:00 ||
|-
|-  style="background:#fbb;"
| 1989 || Loss ||align=left| Daris Sor Thanikul || || France || Decision (Unanimous) || 5 || 3:00 ||
|-
|-  style="background:#cfc;"
| 1989 || Win ||align=left| Michael Partanen || || Den Bosch, Netherlands || KO || 5 || ||
|-
|-  style="background:#cfc;"
| 1989-02-12 || Win ||align=left| Mungkordun Sitchang || || Rouen, France || Decision (Unanimous) || 5 || 3:00 ||
|-
! style=background:white colspan=9 |
|-  style="background:#cfc;"
| 1988 || Win ||align=left| Mourad Jelbi || || Italy || || || ||
|-  style="background:#cfc;"
| 1988 || Win ||align=left| Michel Ubbergen || || || || || ||
|-  style="background:#cfc;"
| 1988 || Win ||align=left| Anakhoun Suwannee || ||Breda, Netherlands || KO (Right uppercut) || 2 || ||
|-  style="background:#fbb;"
| 1988-11-20 || Loss ||align=left| Joao Vieira || || Amsterdam, Netherlands || KO (Right cross) || 5 || ||
|-  style="background:#cfc;"
| 1988-06-19 || Win ||align=left| Mike Morris || || Amsterdam, Netherlands || Decision (Unanimous) || 5 || 3:00 ||
|-  style="background:#cfc;"
| 1988-04-14 || Win ||align=left| Kevin Morris || Champions in Action || Eindhoven, Netherlands || Decision (Unanimous) || 5 || 3:00 ||
|-
! style=background:white colspan=9 |
|-  style="background:#cfc;"
| 1988-02-27 || Win ||align=left| Andre Richard-Nam|| || Amsterdam, Netherlands || KO (Left hook) || 4 || ||
|-
! style=background:white colspan=9 |
|-  style="background:#cfc;"
| 1988-02-06 || Win ||align=left| Khaled Hebieb || || Paris, France|| KO || 1 || || 25-3
|-  style="background:#cfc;"
| 1987-11-15 || Win ||align=left| Kenneth Ramkisoen || || Breda, Netherlands || KO (High kick) || 2 || ||
|-
! style=background:white colspan=9 |
|-  style="background:#cfc;"
| 1987 || Win ||align=left| Tune || || || KO || 1 || ||
|-  style="background:#fbb;"
| 1987-03-21 || Loss ||align=left| Andre Richard-Nam || || Lille, France || Decision (Unanimous) || 5 || 3:00 ||
|-  style="background:#cfc;"
| 1986 || Win ||align=left| L. Cairo || || Amsterdam, Netherlands || KO || || ||
|-  style="background:#cfc;"
| 1986-10-05 || Win ||align=left| Boyd || || Rotterdam, Netherlands || Decision (Unanimous) || 3 || 2:00 ||
|-  style="background:#cfc;"
| 1986-02-02 || Win ||align=left| Kees Twigt || || Rotterdam, Netherlands || KO || 1 || ||
|-  style="background:#cfc;"
| 1986 || Win ||align=left| Andre Masseurs || || Netherlands || KO || 2 || ||

|-  style="background:#fbb;"
| 2005-03-26 || Loss ||align=left| Genki Sudo || Hero's 1 || Saitama, Saitama, Japan || Submission (Leglock) || 1 || 2:54
|-
| colspan=9 | Legend:

See also
List of male kickboxers
List of K-1 events
Muay Thai

References

External links

Ramon Dekkers official website
Gods of War:Ramon Dekkers
Ramon "The Diamond" Dekkers Memorial Page

1969 births
2013 deaths
Dutch male kickboxers
Dutch male mixed martial artists
Dutch Muay Thai practitioners
Featherweight kickboxers
Kickboxing trainers
Lightweight kickboxers
Lightweight mixed martial artists
Mixed martial artists utilizing Muay Thai
Middleweight kickboxers
Muay Thai trainers
Sportspeople from Breda
Welterweight kickboxers